Dombasle may refer to:

Places 
 Dombasle-devant-Darney, French village and commune
 Dombasle-en-Argonne, French commune
 Dombasle-en-Xaintois, French village and commune 
 Dombasle-sur-Meurthe, French commune
 Dombasle, former name of the Algerian commune of Hachem

People 
 Arielle Dombasle (born 1958), French-American singer and actress
 Charles de Meixmoron de Dombasle (1839-1912), French painter.
 Mathieu de Dombasle (1777-1843), French agronomist.